Rudolf Halin (February 3, 1934 – November 14, 2014) was a German graph theorist, known for defining the ends of infinite graphs, for Halin's grid theorem, for extending Menger's theorem to infinite graphs, and for his early research on treewidth and tree decomposition. He is also the namesake of Halin graphs, a class of planar graphs constructed from trees by adding a cycle through the leaves of the given tree; earlier researchers had studied the subclass of cubic Halin graphs but Halin was the first to study this class of graphs in full generality.

Life
Halin was born on February 3, 1934, in Uerdingen.
He earned his doctorate from the University of Cologne in 1962, under the supervision of Klaus Wagner and Karl Dörge, after which he joined the faculty of the University of Hamburg.
He died on November 14, 2014, in Mölln, Schleswig-Holstein.

Recognition
In February 1994, a colloquium was held at the University of Hamburg in honor of Halin's 60th birthday.
In 2017, a special issue of the journal Abhandlungen aus dem Mathematischen Seminar der Universität Hamburg was published in his memory.

Selected publications

Research papers
.
.
.
.
.

Textbooks
Halin, R., Graphentheorie. Vols. I and II published in 1980 and 1981 respectively by Wissenschaftliche Buchgesellschaft. Combined 2nd ed. published in 1989 by Wissenschaftliche Buchgesellschaft.

References

1934 births
2014 deaths
20th-century German mathematicians
Graph theorists
University of Cologne alumni
Academic staff of the University of Hamburg